Horst Hannig (13 November 1921 – 15 May 1943) was a German Luftwaffe fighter ace and posthumous recipient of the Knight's Cross of the Iron Cross with Oak Leaves during World War II. The Knight's Cross of the Iron Cross and its higher grade Oak Leaves was awarded to recognize extreme battlefield bravery or successful military leadership. A flying ace or fighter ace is a military aviator credited with shooting down five or more enemy aircraft during aerial combat. Hannig is credited with 98 aerial victories claimed in over 350 combat missions. He was killed in action following combat with Royal Air Force (RAF) Supermarine Spitfire fighters on 15 May 1943.

Early life and career
Hannig was born on 13 November 1921 in Frankenstein, present-day Ząbkowice Śląskie, at the time in Lower Silesia. He was the son of a secretary of justice. After he graduated with his Abitur (diploma), Hannig joined the military service in the Luftwaffe as a Fahnenjunker (officer cadet) in October 1939. Hannig had a brother Walter who received the German Cross in Gold on 28 April 1943 as an observer with Aufklärungsgruppe (reconnaissance group) 4.(F)/14 of the Luftwaffe.

Following flight training, he was posted to the 6. Staffel (6th squadron) of Jagdgeschwader 54 "Grünherz" (JG 54—54th fighter wing) in early 1941. At the time, 6. Staffel was commanded by Oberleutnant Franz Eckerle while II. Gruppe (2nd group), to which the Staffel was subordinated, was headed by Hauptmann Dietrich Hrabak.

World War II
The German invasion of Poland had begun on 1 September 1939, and marked the beginning of World War II in Europe. In April 1941, II. Gruppe of JG 54 had fought in the invasion of Yugoslavia. Following the surrender of the Royal Yugoslav Army on 17 April 1941, while stationed at an airfield at Zemun near Belgrade, the Geschwader received orders on 3 May 1941 to turn over all Bf 109-Es so they could receive the new Bf 109-F variant. Transition training was completed at Airfield Stolp-Reitz in Pomerania. Following intensive training, the Geschwader was moved to airfields in Eastern Prussia.

Operation Barbarossa
II. Gruppe under command of Hrabak was moved to Trakehnen on 20 June 1941. The Wehrmacht launched Operation Barbarossa, the invasion of the Soviet Union, on 22 June with II. Gruppe supporting Army Group North in its strategic goal towards Leningrad. On the first day of the invasion, II. Gruppe flew multiple missions in support of German bombers attacking Soviet airfields near Kowno, present-day Kaunas. That day, Hannig claimed his first aerial victory, a Tupolev SB-2 bomber. On 25 June, the Gruppe followed the German advance and relocated to an airfield at Kowno. Two days later they moved to Dünaburg, present-day Daugavpils, where Hannig claimed an Ilyushin DB-3 bomber shot down. On 28 June, the 8th Panzer Division had established a bridgehead across the Daugava. Operating from Dünaburg over the bridgehead, Hannig claimed a SB-2 bomber shot down on 30 June, three SB-3 bombers on 2 July, and another SB-2 bomber on 6 July. The following day, III. Gruppe moved to Ostrov. On 17 July, for seven aerial victories to date, he was awarded the Iron Cross 2nd Class. That day, the Gruppe moved to an airfield named Sarudinje located near Pleskov, present-day Pskov, southeast of Lake Peipus. Here, Hannig claimed an I-18 fighter, an early German designation for a Mikoyan-Gurevich MiG-1 fighter, on 19 July and a DB-3 bomber on 25 July.

On 25 July, II. Gruppe moved to a makeshift airfield named Mal. Owsischtschi located near Lake Ozero Samro east of Lake Peipus where they remained until 7 September. Here, the Gruppe supported German forces in the attack on Leningrad. In August, II. Gruppe flew missions to Leningrad and over the coastal area west of Leningrad. Here, Hannig claimed an Polikarpov I-16 fighter and I-18 fighter on 12 August, another I-16 fighter the following day, an SB-2 bomber on 14 August, two I-18 fighters on 18 August, another I-16 fighter the next day, and a Polikarpov I-15 fighter on 5 September. On 7 September, the Gruppe relocated to Torrossowa, an airfield closer to Leningrad. In September, Hannig was awarded the Iron Cross 1st Class and the Honor Goblet of the Luftwaffe on 15 September. Flying from Torrossowa, he was credited with nine I-18 fighters shot down, two on 11 September, one on 12, 14, 16 and 19 September each, two further on 23 September. On 26 September he claimed an I-16 fighter before the Gruppe moved to Staraya Russa south of Lake Ilmen on 27 September. Here, Hannig claimed two I-18 fighters, one on 2 and 5 October each, and a SB-3 bomber on 14 October, taking his total to 30 aerial victories. In early November, the Gruppe was withdrawn from the Eastern Front for a period of rest and replenishment where they were based at airfields in Döberitz, and later at Uetersen. On 24 November, Hannig was awarded the German Cross in Gold.

Eastern Front
On 20 January 1942, the Gruppe began relocating to the Eastern Front where they would be based at Siverskaya near Leningrad. Flying missions over the Volkhov, Hannig claimed his first aerial victory in 1942 over an I-18 fighter on 5 February. Operating from Siverskaya during the Battle of Lyuban, Hannig claimed five further aerial victories. On 14 February, he shot down a Polikarpov R-5 reconnaissance bomber followed by another R-5 aircraft three days later. He then claimed a Petlyakov Pe-2 bomber on 23 February. Hannig then claimed a Lend-Lease Curtiss P-40 Warhawk fighter on 5 March followed by an I-18 fighter on 15 March.

On 20 March, II. Here, the Gruppe supported German forces fighting in the Demyansk Pocket and Kholm Pocket. In late March and April 1942, Hannig claimed further twelve aerial victories, increasing his total to 48 aerial victories claimed. Here on 7 May, Hannig claimed a Yakovlev Yak-1 fighter shot down. On 9 May 1942, Leutnant (second Lieutenant) Hannig was awarded the Knight's Cross of the Iron Cross having flown over 200 operations and claiming 48 victories. He and Leutnant Hans Beißwenger received the Knight's Cross from General der Flieger Helmuth Förster at Siverskaya. Following the Knight's Cross presentation, Hannig claimed his next aerial victory on 11 May when he shot down a Mikoyan-Gurevich MiG-3 fighter in the Demyansk combat area. He then shot down two Lavochkin-Gorbunov-Gudkov LaGG-3 fighters, one on 15 and 18 May each.

In July 1942, II. Gruppe was re-equipped with the Bf 109 G-2. On 24 July, he claimed his 54th victory, an Ilyushin Il-2 ground-attack aircraft near Lychkovo located southeast of Lake Ilmen. On 12 August, 5. Staffel was detached from II. Gruppe and sent to Oryol where they were based at an airfield named Oryol-West. On 31 August, II. Gruppe was again united at Rjelbitzi where the Gruppe came under control of Luftflotte 1 (Air Fleet 1). On the morning of 2 September, Hannig and Unteroffizier Walter Heck claimed two Yak-1 fighters shot down, one each. The a Yak-1 fighters belonged to the 21 IAP Fighter Regiment. The pilots, Starshiy Leytenant Rubtsov survived the encounter with injuries while Serzhant Levinskiy was killed in action.

On 7 October, Hauptmann Joachim Wandel, the commander of 5. Staffel was killed in action. In consequence, Hannig succeeded Wandel as Staffelkapitän (squadron leader) of 5. Staffel the following day. In early November, the Gruppe fought in the combat area north of Demyansk. Here, Hannig claimed his last aerial victories on the Eastern Front on 5 November. Taking his total to 90 aerial victories claimed, he was credited with destroying four LaGG-3 fighters that day. Three of which on one mission. On 28 September in aerial combat, Hannig flew his Bf 109 G-2 (Werknummer 10366—factory number) into the ground near Andronovo. Hannig was then transferred to the Western Front and command of 5. Staffel was passed on to Hauptmann Paul Steindl.

Western Front and death

On 27 January 1943, Hannig was appointed Staffelkapitän of 2. Staffel of Jagdgeschwader 2 "Richthofen" (JG 2—2nd fighter fing) based in France. He replaced Oberleutnant Christian Eickhoff who had been killed in action the day before. The Staffel was subordinated to I. Gruppe of JG 2 headed by Major Helmut-Felix Bolz. While serving with 2. Staffel of JG 2, he claimed further eight aerial victories, including one four-engine United States Army Air Forces (USAAF) heavy bomber. On 16 February, the USAAF VIII Bomber Command attacked Saint-Nazaire. I. Gruppe claimed the destruction of five Boeing B-17 Flying Fortress bombers, including one shot down by Hannig northeast of Lannion. On 28 March, bombers of VIII Bomber Command escorted by Supermarine Spitfire fighters headed for Rouen. I. Gruppe claimed six aerial victories, including a Spitfire claimed by Hannig northwest of Fécamp. VIII Bomber Command targeted Antwerp on 4 April. Fighting this attack force, Hannig was credited with the destruction of a Spitfire shot down northeast of Cherbourg. On 13 April, he claimed two further Spitfires shotdown southwest of Caen. Two days later he claimed a Hawker Typhoon fighter north-northwest of Goderville and another Spitfire on 16 April north-northwest of Saint-Valery-en-Caux.

The Royal Air Force (RAF) targeted the Caen-Carpiquet Airdrome on 15 May 1943. Defending against this attack, elements of I. Gruppe intercepted the RAF fighters and claimed four aerial victories, two of which were not confirmed. Hannig was credited with the destruction of a Spitfire shot down east of Troarn, his 98th aerial victory. In this engagement JG 3 lost four aircraft with three pilots killed in action, including Hannig. He was shot down in his Focke-Wulf Fw 190 A-4 (Werknummer 0734) near the airfield at Rocquancourt. His victor was Squadron Leader J. Charles leading Yellow Section of No. 611 Squadron. He had managed to bail out but his parachute failed to open. Hannig was posthumously awarded the 364th Knight's Cross of the Iron Cross with Oak Leaves (Ritterkreuz des Eisernen Kreuzes mit Eichenlaub) on 3 January 1944 and posthumously promoted to Oberleutnant (first Lieutenant). He was interred at the Saint-Désir-de-Lisieux German war cemetery. He was succeeded by Oberleutnant Karl Haberland as commander of 2. Staffel.

Summary of career

Aerial victory claims
According to Obermaier and Spick, Hannig was credited with 98 aerial victories, 90 on the Eastern Front and 8 on the Western Front, claimed in over 350 combat missions. Mathews and Foreman, authors of Luftwaffe Aces — Biographies and Victory Claims, researched the German Federal Archives and found documentation for 97 aerial victory claims. This number includes 90 on the Eastern Front and 7 on the Western Front, including one four-engined bomber.

Victory claims were logged to a map-reference (PQ = Planquadrat), for example "PQ 54251". These sectors were then subdivided into 36 smaller units to give a location area 3 × 4 km in size.

Awards
 Iron Cross (1939)
 2nd Class (17 July 1941)
 1st Class (September 1941)
 Honour Goblet of the Luftwaffe on 15 September 1941 as Leutnant in a Jagdgeschwader
 German Cross in Gold on 24 November 1941 as Leutnant in the II./Jagdgeschwader 54
 Knight's Cross of the Iron Cross with Oak Leaves
 Knight's Cross on 9 May 1942 as Leutnant and pilot in the 6./Jagdgeschwader 54
 364th Oak Leaves on 3 January 1944 (posthumously) as Leutnant and Staffelführer of the 2./Jagdgeschwader 2 "Richthofen"

Notes

References

Citations

Bibliography

 
 
 
 
 
 
 
 
 
 
 
 
 
 
 
 
 
 
 
 
 
 

1921 births
1943 deaths
People from Ząbkowice Śląskie
People from the Province of Lower Silesia
Luftwaffe pilots
German World War II flying aces
Recipients of the Gold German Cross
Recipients of the Knight's Cross of the Iron Cross with Oak Leaves
Luftwaffe personnel killed in World War II
Aviators killed by being shot down
Burials at Saint-Désir-de-Lisieux German war cemetery